Mansueto may refer to the following people:
Given name
Mansueto Bianchi (1949–2016), Italian Roman Catholic bishop 
Pietro Mansueto Ferrari (1823–1893), Italian entomologist
Mansueto Velasco (born 1974), Filipino boxer and comedian 

Surname
Joe Mansueto (born 1956), American billionaire entrepreneur 
Joe and Rika Mansueto Library in Chicago
Mansueto High School in Chicago
Trizer D. Mansueto, Filipino historian